The 2017–18 Spanish stage of the UEFA Regions' Cup was the 12th staging of Spanish stage of the UEFA Regions' Cup. The winners qualified for the 2019 UEFA Regions' Cup.

Castile and León successfully defended their title.

Competition format
The eighteen teams joined the preliminary round, played as mini-tournaments with three teams in each group, where only the first qualified team advanced to further stages.

The winners of groups A, B, C and D joined the intermediate stage while the winners of the groups E and F directly qualified for the semifinals.

Preliminary stage

Group A

Group B

Group C

Group D

Group E

Group F

Intermediate round
The first leg was played on 31 January 2018, while the second leg of the series between Valencian Community and Galicia was played on 14 February and the one between Castile and León and Catalonia, on 28 February.

|}

Final stage
The final stage will be played on 30 March and 1 April 2018 at Estadio Pedro Sancho in Zaragoza, Aragon.

Bracket

References

External links
Royal Spanish Football Federation

2017–18 in Spanish football
Spanish stage of the UEFA Regions' Cup